The CHA Player of the Year was an annual award given out at the conclusion of the College Hockey America regular season to the best player in the conference as voted by the coaches of each CHA team.

The Player of the Year was first awarded in 2000 and every year thereafter until 2010 when the CHA was disbanded when they could no longer retain their automatic bid to the NCAA Tournament.

Award winners

Winners by school

Winners by position

See also
CHA Awards

References

General

Specific

External links

College ice hockey trophies and awards in the United States